Dámaso Antonio Larrañaga (Montevideo, 9 December 1771 – Montevideo, 16 February 1848) was a Uruguayan priest, naturalist and botanist.

He was one of those principally responsible for the founding of the National Library of Uruguay and the National University of Uruguay.

The private Universidad Católica del Uruguay Dámaso Antonio Larrañaga (founded 1985) is named after him.

References

1771 births
1848 deaths
Uruguayan people of Basque descent
Uruguayan botanists
Uruguayan naturalists
19th-century Uruguayan Roman Catholic priests
Catholic clergy scientists
Uruguayan politicians
Uruguayan librarians
People from Montevideo
Apostolic vicars of Uruguay
Burials at Montevideo Metropolitan Cathedral